Miles College is a private historically black college in Fairfield, Alabama. Founded in 1898, it is associated with the Christian Methodist Episcopal Church (CME Church) and a member of the United Negro College Fund.

History

Miles College began organization efforts in 1893 and was founded in 1898 by the Colored Methodist Episcopal Church. It was chartered as Miles Memorial College, in honor of Bishop William H. Miles. In 1941 the name was changed to Miles College.

Modern history
In January 2020, Charles Barkley, who is an Alabama native, donated $1 million to Miles College, under first female President Dr. Bobbie Knight. Barkley's gift is the biggest donation from a single person that the school has ever received. Dr. Knight said the donation will kickstart efforts to raise $100 million.

Academics
Miles is accredited by the Commission on Colleges of the Southern Association of Colleges and Schools (for the awarding of baccalaureate degrees), the Alabama State Department of Education, and the Council of Social Work Education. Miles College offers 25 bachelor's degrees in the following divisions: Business and Accounting, Communications, Education, Humanities, Natural Sciences and Mathematics, Social and Behavioral Sciences. Miles College is one of 41 schools in the nation with a Center of Academic Excellence under the office of the Director of National Intelligence.

Miles offers 28 Bachelor's degree programs in six academic divisions to an enrollment of approximately 1,700 students and also offers an honors program for undergraduate students with exceptional academic records.

Campus
Miles College purchased the Lloyd Noland Hospital site, which more than doubled the size of the campus.  The college completed the construction of a new student activity and dining center, a new welcome and admissions center, and a new 204 bed residence hall. Part of the campus is listed on the National Register of Historic Places.

Sloan Alumni Stadium, named after the college's 13th president, Albert J. H. Sloan II, was recently expanded to include a $1 million Environ-Turf field.

Student activities
Organizations for students include the Student Government Association, Honors Curriculum, academic clubs, religious organizations, National Pan-Hellenic Council organizations, general interest clubs, a gospel choir, and a concert choir.

Radio Station
The school operates a radio station, WMWI FM 88.7. It was established in 2009 and is licensed to Demopolis, Alabama.

Marching band
The Miles College band is known as the Purple Marching Machine (PMM). The Purple Marching Machine was established in 1996, under the direction of Prof. Arthur Means, Jr. There are nearly 200 members in the band now and it is under the direction of Willie Snipes Jr. PMM has performed at the Macy's Thanksgiving Day Parade, numerous battle of the bands, and for the Atlanta Falcons.  PMM is accompanied by the Golden Stars danceline and Steaming Flags color guard.

Athletics
The Miles College athletics program competes in the NCAA Division II's Southern Intercollegiate Athletic Conference (SIAC). The program has men's and women's sports that include: basketball, football, volleyball, track, baseball, softball, cross country, and golf.  Their mascot is the Golden Bears.

Presidents
L. L. Wilson, –1904;
R. S. Williams, –1907;
James Bray, 1907–1912;
William A. Bell, 1912–1913;
John Wesley Gilbert, 1913–1914;
George A. Payne, 1914–1918;
Robert T. Brown, 1918–1922;
George L. Word, 1922–1926;
Mack Burley, 1926–1931;
Brooks Dickens, 1931–1936;
William A. Bell, 1936–1961;
Lucius Pitts, 1961–1971;
W. Clyde Williams, 1971–1986;
Leroy Johnson, 1986–1989;
Albert Sloan, 1989–2005;
George French Jr, 2006–August 31, 2019;
Bobbie Knight (interim), September 1, 2019 – March 5, 2020;
Bobbie Knight, March 5, 2020–

Notable alumni
Richard Arrington Jr. - First African-American Mayor of the City of Birmingham
U. W. Clemon - First African-American federal judge in the State of Alabama
Autherine Lucy - First African-American to attend the University of Alabama
Fred Horn - Politician, former member of the Alabama House of Representatives
Vince Hill - American football player
Juandalynn Givan - Politician, member of the Alabama House of Representatives
Thales McReynolds - Former NBA player
Bennett M. Stewart - Former Democratic U.S. Representative from Illinois
Paul A. G. Stewart - The 50th Bishop of the Christian Methodist Episcopal Church and Vice Chairperson of Board of Trustees Miles College
Cleopatra Tucker - Politician, who has served in the New Jersey General Assembly since 2008

Notable faculty and staff 

 John U. Monro - former dean of Harvard College and director of freshman studies at the college
 Sam Shade - professional football player and college football coach
 Steven Whitman - public health researcher

See also
 List of historically black colleges of the United States
 Miles Law School

References

Further reading

External links

 
 Official athletics website

 
African-American history of Alabama
Buildings and structures in Jefferson County, Alabama
Education in Jefferson County, Alabama
Educational institutions established in 1905
Historic districts in Jefferson County, Alabama
Historic districts on the National Register of Historic Places in Alabama
Historically black universities and colleges in the United States
Methodism in Alabama
National Register of Historic Places in Jefferson County, Alabama
Universities and colleges accredited by the Southern Association of Colleges and Schools
Universities and colleges affiliated with the Christian Methodist Episcopal Church
Private universities and colleges in Alabama
1905 establishments in Alabama